This is a list of fictional humanoid characters or races who have squid-like faces. Unless stated otherwise, their common feature is the appearance of tentacles on the face or head. 

One of the earliest such characters is "Cthulhu", created by H. P. Lovecraft in 1926. 

Later beings with similar characteristics are sometimes described by the neologisms "cthulhoid" or "cthulhumanoid", based on that name.

Alien Intelligences in the role-playing games by Palladium Books, including the Old Ones, were powerful beings who might not take any recognizable shape, but in many cases have tentacles protruding from the body.
Bane from Mobile Legends is a playable character who is a pirate with octopus face.
Captain Squid is a playable character who is a pirate with octopus face from the video game, Roblox.
Cthulhu is a cosmic entity who was created by writer H. P. Lovecraft. He first appeared in "The Call of Cthulhu", which was written in 1926. In it, Cthulhu is described as resembling "...an octopus, a dragon, and a human caricature.... A pulpy, tentacled head surmounted a grotesque scaly body with rudimentary wings".
Cultists in the webcomic 8-bit Theater induce new members by beheading them and implanting the larva of an "Old One" in the body, where it matures, giving the Cultists the appearance of a humanoid with long tentacles in the lower half of their faces.
The Cuylers, in American animation Squidbillies, are an impoverished family of anthropomorphic hillbilly squids living in the Appalachian mountains.
The Dweller-in-Darkness in the Marvel Comics universe is a demon, one of the Fear Lords. He has a living head mounted on a robotic body, but if detached from the body can move by means of the tentacles near his mouth.
Emma, the main character of Four Eyes!, is an 11-year-old alien girl from the planet Albacore 7, who attends a school on Earth. Usually squid-like in appearance, Emma uses a device shaped like a pair of glasses to alter her appearance into a human form.
Bill Farrell in the 1958 film I Married a Monster from Outer Space is revealed to be a squid-faced alien disguised as a human.
Illithids in the Dungeons & Dragons fantasy role-playing game (also known as "mind flayers") are monstrous humanoid aberrations with psionic powers. The band Mindflayer used images of them on the cover of their album Take Your Skin Off.
The Daleks, the most iconic alien species of the popular British sci-fi series Doctor Who have an octupus-like shape and structure within the mechanic shell.
Davy Jones is the Captain of the Flying Dutchman in the Pirates of the Caribbean film series. He is a computer-generated character, with a thick set of tentacles in place of a beard.
Captain Madison from Final Fantasy XIV is a pirate captain at Sastasha Seagrot and thrall to the primal Leviathan who is transformed into a squid-faced humanoid after his failure in an earlier mission. A transformed pirate captain who is paired with a kraken, he is most likely a reference to Davy Jones from the 2006 film. 
Glorft, a hostile alien species from the Cartoon Network animated series "Megas XLR". The best-known character is the leader of the Glorft army, Gorrath in the TV show.
The Millennian was a squid-like creature that mutated into Orga in the film Godzilla 2000.
The Ood are a humanoid alien species in British television series Doctor Who, with tentacles on the lower part of the face.
The pak'ma'ra, a recurring species in Babylon 5, are intelligent, spiritual carrion-eaters.
Protheans in the Mass Effect games were an extinct humanoid race with squid-like heads, tentacles hanging from the face like a beard. In mass effect 3 the protheans were depicted completely different with four eyes and no tentacles.
Quarrens, nicknamed "squid heads" in the Star Wars Universe, are aquatic humanoids from the planet Mon Calamari.
Quintessons, tentacled alien beings with five faces, created the Transformers in the Transformers universe.
Squid Girl, in the manga series of the same name, is a girl from the sea who has blue squid-like tentacles in place of hair.
Squidface Brutes, the villains with squid-like faces and crab-like claws from Skylanders.
Vilgax in Ben 10 is a Chimera Sui Generis. Exposed to water, he transforms into a giant squid-like creature, which he refers to as his true form.
Topo, a supporting character in the comic book series Aquaman: Sword of Atlantis.
Wash Buckler, a pirate Skylander with octopus-like face from the toyline video game, Skylanders.
The Water Elemental in the video game Wrath Unleashed is a squid-like being of pure water.
Xeexi, a squid-like Mutraddi assassin in the American animated show Sym-Bionic Titan, was described in Wired magazine as "one of the scariest villains ever to grace television".
Zardalu in the Heritage Universe novels are an aggressive, very strong squid-like species.
Zoidberg in the animation Futurama is an alien from the planet Decapod 10. Decapodians have tentacles over the mouth and can squirt ink, but have lobster-like claws instead of hands.

See also
Giant squid in popular culture

References

Fictional extraterrestrial life forms
Fictional squid
Squid-faced